The women's quadruple sculls rowing event at the 2011 Pan American Games will be held from October 16–19 at the Canoe & Rowing Course in Ciudad Guzman. The defending Pan American Games champion is Cristin McCarty, Peggy Hyslop, Zoe Hoskins and Nathalie Maurer of Canada.

Schedule
All times are Central Standard Time (UTC-6).

Results

Heat 1

Final A

References

Women's rowing at the 2011 Pan American Games